The Federalsburg A's were a minor league baseball team based in Federalsburg, Maryland. Federalsburg teams played as exclusively as members of the Class D level Eastern Shore League from 1937 to 1941 and 1946 to 1949, winning the 1939 league pennant. The "A's" moniker was interchanged with the similar "Athletics" and "Little A's" before the franchise became the "Feds" for their final season of 1949. Hosting all minor league home games at Federal Park, Federalsburg played as a minor league affiliate of the Philadelphia Athletics from 1937 to 1941 and 1946 to 1948.

History

Eastern Shore League 1937–1941
Minor league baseball began in Federalsburg, Maryland in 1937. The Federalsburg A's became members as the eight–team Class D level Eastern Shore League. Federalsburg became a minor league affiliate of the Philadelphia Athletics, a partnership that would continue until 1949. Playing under manager George Short, Federalsburg ended their first season of play with a 52–45 record, placing 5th in the regular season standings, finishing 7.5 games behind the 1st place Salisbury Indians. Salisbury had 21 wins taken away due to roster violations, but still won the pennant.

As there were no hotels in Federalsburg during the era in which the Federalsburg A's played, players had to stay in private residences. Typically, players paid $1 a day (from their $75 a month salary) to stay with families in their homes near their home ballpark of Federal Field. It was reported the local community “adopted” players and treated them like family members.

Continuing play in the 1938 Eastern Shore League, the Federalsburg A's placed 5th in the eight–team league, with Charlie Moss serving as manager. Federalsburg ended the 1938 regular season with a 56–56 record, finishing 9.0 games behind the 1st place Salisbury Indians. Bill Phillips of Federalsburg led the North Shore League with 31 home runs.

The 1939 Federalsburg A's won the Eastern Shore League pennant. Federalsburg finished 1st in the eight–team league and ended the 1938 regular season with a 83–38 record under manager Sammy Holbrook. In the playoffs, the Dover Orioles defeated Federalsburg 3 games to 0. Federalsburg pitcher Les Hinckle led the Eastern Shore League with 27 wins, 309 strikeouts and a 2.49 ERA.

The 1940 Federalsburg A's ended the Eastern Shore League season with a record of 57–67, playing under managers Samuel Nisinoff and Don Maynard. Federalsburg placed 5th in the final standings, finishing 17.0 games behind the 1st place Dover Orioles in the eight–team league. Lloyd Rice of Federalsburg led the Eastern Shore League in batting average, hitting .363.

The Federalsburg A's finished last in the 1941 Eastern Shore League. With a record of 35–73, Federalsburg placed 6th in the six–team league, finishing 31.0 games behind the 1st place Milford Giants in the final regular season standings. The Eastern Shore League did not return to play for the 1942 season due to World War II.<

Eastern Shore League 1946–1949
In 1946, the Federalsburg A's returned to Eastern Shore League play as the league reformed. Federalsburg placed last in the 1946 standings. Federalsburg ended the 1946 season with a record of 37–87, placing 8th in the eight–team league, finishing 50.5 games behind the 1st place Centreville Orioles, as Lew Krausse Sr. managed the team.

The Federalsburg A's of the Eastern Shore League ended the 1947 season with a record of 62–63. The A's placed 4th in the standings, finishing 29.0 games behind the 1st place Cambridge Dodgers, as Pep Rambert served as player/manager, leading the North Shore League in batting average, hitting. 376.Ducky Detweiler of Federalsburg led the league with 29 home runs and 133 RBI.

The 1948 Federalsburg A's ended the season with a record of 49–76. Federalsburg placed 7th in the league standings under manager Ducky Detweiler. The A's finished 42.0 games behind the 1st place Salisbury Cardinals in the final regular season standings.

In their final Season of play, the franchise played as the Federalsburg Feds under manager Carl McQuillen and advanced to the league finals. The Federalsburg Feds ended the 1949 Eastern Shore League season with a record of 63–56, placing 2nd and finishing 4.5 games behind the 1st place Easton Yankees in the regular season standings. After a round robin series of the top four teams, the Rehoboth Beach Sea Hawks defeated Federalsburg in the Finals, 4 games to 3.

The Eastern Shore League permanently folded after the 1949 season. Federalsburg, Maryland has not hosted another minor league team.

The ballpark
Federalsburg teams played home games exclusively at Federal Park. The ballpark had a capacity of 1,200 in 1937 and 1,800 in 1946. The park dimensions were (Left, Center, Right): 323–346–335 in 1937. Today, ballpark artifacts are on display at the Federalsburg Historical Society & Museum. The team clubhouse building still exists. Federal Park was located at University Avenue and Greenridge Road, Federalsburg, Maryland.

Timeline

Year–by–year records

Notable alumni

Ducky Detweiler (1939–1940, 1947–1949), (1948, MGR)
Buck Etchison (1949)
Gene Hermanski (1939–1940)
George Hennessey (1938)
Jim Higgins (1938)
Sammy Holbrook (1938–1939)
Lew Krausse Sr. (1946, MGR)
Walt Masters (1939)
Charlie Moss (1938, MGR)
Dick Mulligan (1940)
Barney Mussill (1938–1939)
Ron Northey (1939)
Tony Parisse (1940)
Pep Rambert (1947, MGR)
Joe Rullo (1939–1940)
Jim Schelle (1939)
Elmer Valo (1939) Philadelphia Baseball Wall of Fame
Jack Wallaesa (1939)
Spider Wilhelm (1947–1948)

See also
Federalsburg A's players Federalsburg Feds players

References

External links
 Federal Park photo and 1948 team photo
Baseball Reference

Professional baseball teams in Maryland
Defunct baseball teams in Maryland
Baseball teams established in 1937
Baseball teams disestablished in 1948
Philadelphia Athletics minor league affiliates
Defunct Eastern Shore League teams
Federalsburg, Maryland
Baseball teams disestablished in 1941
Baseball teams established in 1946